Chargeware is a seemingly valid-looking mobile application used to charge a user for services without proper notification or knowledge. Often focused on Internet pornography, third-party porn apps are downloaded onto a user's mobile device, in turn infecting their phone with the malware known as Chargeware.

The purpose of Chargeware is to manipulate a user into agreeing to unclear terms such that fees and charges are applied without the user's full understanding or consent.

Chargeware is deliberately difficult to renege from, so that charges can continue for as long as possible without carrier interference. Simply put, it's a deliberate move to continue paying for something you never wanted to.

In 2013, hundreds of thousands of users, primarily in France and the UK, experienced applications of this nature which ultimately led to other forms of malware on their mobile device(s). Various other countries, such as Spain, encountered Chargeware infections that almost matched the number of adware infections; Japan had the lowest number of Chargeware infections of any other country.

Hackers are reportedly learning their market and changing tactics (i.e., mobile malware) so that operations are harder to trace and harder to shut down. Said markets also include specific countries, since charging practices can vary on either a country or carrier basis.

References

Types of malware
Internet fraud